The 1905–06 season was Manchester City F.C.'s fifteenth season of league football and third consecutive season in the top flight of English football.

At the end of the season, Manchester City were investigated by the FA for allegations of awarding players bonuses, which was at the time against FA regulations. Consequently, the club were found guilty and seventeen players were fined, suspended from football until 1 January 1907 and were banned from representing Man City in future. The club was forced to shed most of its players, including its best performers and early club legends such as Billy Meredith, Sandy Turnbull and Billie Gillespie. Though several players followed guidance and moved to Manchester United (then not a rival but a fellow community club) or other league clubs, Gillespie refused to play his fine and instead moved to America. In addition to this, manager Tom Maley was banned from football for life, and left the club.

Team Kit

Football League First Division

Results summary

Reports

FA Cup

Squad statistics

Squad
Appearances for competitive matches only

Scorers

All

League

FA Cup

See also
Manchester City F.C. seasons

References

External links
Extensive Manchester City statistics site

1905-06
English football clubs 1905–06 season